Rossi Residencial is the sixth largest Brazilian residential construction company, after its big competitors such as PDG, Cyrela Brazil Realty, MRV and Brookfield Incorporações.

The company operates in real estate. Is present in more than 56 Brazilian cities, from headquarters in São Paulo and in regional offices located in cities such as Campinas, Porto Alegre, Rio de Janeiro, Belo Horizonte and others.

The Rossi takes part in all phases of a real estate venture. Exploration of the land to the project, construction for sale, by delivery of property.
	
Rossi Residencial is part of the Rossi Group, founded in 1913, today the 4th generation of the Rossi family, one of the leading groups of engineering, construction and incorporation of Brazil, which over its history of cooperating with the development of the country not only through the engineering, but also in other areas.

Since its founding, the Rossi Group is characterized by the development of modern administrative and operational methods, the use of efficient building technologies and increasing experience in all types of construction.

Follow below Rossi's trajectory:

1980 
Foundation of Rossi Residencial SA

Initially the company focused on the development of high standard residential properties in the metropolitan region of São Paulo.

1992 
Plan 100 project creation

Beginning of operations in the segments aimed at the middle and lower classes. It was Rossi's creative response to the housing finance problem that made it difficult for the middle class to buy real estate. About 14,166 * units were delivered throughout Brazil. (* until July 2008).

1994 
Regional Distribution

Inauguration of the regional CAMPINAS. São Paulo's activity then became regional SÃO PAULO.

1996 
Launch of the Vida Nova project

By utilizing basic finishing materials and ensuring the quality and style of the venture, Rossi delivered 5,241 * units geared to the economy segment (as of September 2005).

1997 
Issuance of shares

Rossi raised $100 million for business expansion by issuing shares on the BM & FBOVESPA and ADRs on the New York Stock Exchange.

Rossi becomes a pioneer in securitization of real estate receivables.

1999 
Villa Flora project launched

Inauguration of a new housing concept for the economic segment, with complete infrastructure with landscaping, sewage treatment plant, squares, parks, shopping center, chapel, day care center, school, club and police station.

Inauguration of the regional SOUTH based in Porto Alegre.

Implementation of SAP business management system.

2002 
Investment Diversification

In order to reinforce its activities with the public with the highest purchasing power, Rossi acquires América Properties, which specializes in the construction of high standard residential and commercial real estate.

2003 
Security to invest and grow

By raising R $80 million in the capital market and adhering to Level 1 of BM & FBovespa's Differentiated Corporate Governance Practices, Rossi ensured its growth.

Inauguration of the regional Rio de Janeiro based in Rio de Janeiro.

2006 
Bovespa's New Market Entry

With the entry into the Novo Mercado, Rossi expanded Tag Along to 100%, offering a greater degree of protection and transparency to its shareholders.

Business Expansion

Funding of R $1.012 billion, enabling the purchase of new land, the payment of debt and the working capital of new projects.

Inauguration of the regional BRASILIA, based in the Federal District.

Establishment of joint ventures with other regional developers.

Product Diversification

Entry in the segment of urban projects.

2007 
Business Expansion

Inauguration of the northeastern regional based in Salvador, Rossi inaugurates a new regional to expand operations and reach the northeastern states.

Inauguration of the OESTE regional office based in São José do Rio Preto, to operate in the west of the state of São Paulo and northern Paraná.

Creation of own sales team

Creation of Rossi Vendas, its own sales team, with the objective of guaranteeing a quality service and a high degree of commitment, as the brokers are constantly trained and aligned with Rossi's values.

2008 
Branding Management

In order to increase the Rossi brand strategic value, the company began to follow the management model based on branding, redefined its essence and reformulated its visual identity, aligning communication and business strategy based on the desired values and attributes of the Rossi brand.

Ibovespa Index Entry

Rossi's shares are now part of the IBovespa portfolio. The Bovespa Index is the most important indicator of the average performance of Brazilian stock market quotations, as it reflects the behavior of the main securities traded on the BM & FBOVESPA.

Capitalization

Issuance of R $150 million in shares.

2009 
Rossi Ideal launch

Launch of Rossi Ideal line projects aimed at the economic segment and within the guidelines of the federal government incentive plan Minha Casa, Minha Vida.

Rossi Capital

Establishment of a joint venture with Construtora Capital to operate in northern states of the country.

2010 
Business Expansion

Inauguration of the PAULISTANA regional office, based in São Paulo, focusing on medium and high standard properties in São Paulo.

Rossi Project Launch More

Launch of Rossi line projects More focused on the economic segment.

Toctao Rossi

Establishment of a joint venture with Toctao Engenharia to operate in Goiânia and region.

Birthday

Rossi celebrates 30 years.

2011 
Norcon Rossi

Establishment of a joint venture with Construtora Norcon to operate in the markets of Alagoas, Bahia, Pernambuco and Sergipe under the Norcon Rossi brand.

Heavy use of technology in construction

Investment in large-scale construction technologies, establishing precast factories in Brasilia (DF), Campinas (SP), Campo Grande (MT), Hortolandia (SP), Manaus (AM), Serra (ES) and Porto Alegre ( LOL).

2012 
Rossi Commercial Properties and Rossi Urbanizadora

Rossi presented the process of developing two new business areas, Rossi Commercial Properties, for shopping centers linked to shopping malls, and Rossi Urbanizadora, highlighting the areas under development. Through these subsidiaries, it will be possible to monetize and develop projects that are already available in Rossi's land stock more efficiently.

2013 
Digital Outlet

Innovative action that used the Hangout channel and YouTube to make real estate sales online. For this initiative, the company was recognized with the 20th ABEMD Award in 2014.

2014 
Robot view

Clients met real estate from a distance through a camera-equipped robot. The campaign received the Real Estate Marketing award at the 2nd edition of Conecta Imobi 2015.

2015 
The EntreVerdes Campinas project received the Master Real Estate Award 2015, in the Environment Preservation category.

References

Construction and civil engineering companies of Brazil
Real estate companies of Brazil
Companies based in São Paulo
Construction and civil engineering companies established in 1992
Companies listed on B3 (stock exchange)
Brazilian companies established in 1992